Thomas George may refer to:

 Thomas George (Australian politician) (born 1949), member of the New South Wales Legislative Assembly
 Thomas E. George, American politician from Missouri
 Thomas F. George, chancellor and professor of chemistry and physics at the University of Missouri-St. Louis
 Thomas N. George (born 1938), American politician from Massachusetts
 Tom George  (born 1956), American politician from Michigan
 Thomas George (rower) (born 1994), British rower
 Thomas St George (1615–1703), English officer of arms
 Thomas St George (Clogher MP), Irish politician
Thomas R. St. George, American author
 Tom George (director), British director of film and television